Dirty Jeans and Mudslide Hymns is an album by John Hiatt, released in August 2011 on the New West label. It was produced by Kevin Shirley.

Its 'Detroit Made' was covered by the Detroit-born Bob Seger on 2014's Ride Out. "When I heard the John Hiatt song," Seger recalled, "I downloaded it, put it in my car and drove around and sang harmony parts. And, of course, the subject matter's a no-brainer because we all love cars in Michigan."

Track listing
 "Damn This Town" – 4:52
 "'til I Get My Lovin' Back" – 3:27
 "I Love That Girl" – 4:19
 "All the Way Under" – 3:49
 "Don't Wanna Leave You Now" – 5:42
 "Detroit Made" – 3:52
 "Hold On for Your Love" – 6:21
 "Train to Birmingham" – 3:37
 "Down Around My Place" – 5:59
 "Adios to California" – 3:46
 "When New York Had Her Heart Broke" – 5:08

Personnel
John Hiatt - vocals, acoustic and electric guitar
Doug Lancio - electric guitars, mandolin, Hammertone
Patrick O'Hearn - bass guitar
Kenneth Blevins - drums

Additional musicians
Doug Henthorn - additional backing vocals
Russ Pahl - pedal steel guitar
Arlan Schierbaum - keyboards
Reese Wynans - organ on "Down Around My Place"
Orchestration - Jeff Bova and the Bovaland Orchestra

References

2011 albums
John Hiatt albums
New West Records albums